Jack Latham is a British electronic music producer and DJ who performs under the alias Jam City. He has been active since 2010 and records on the label Night Slugs. He has released three full-length albums: 2012's Classical Curves, 2015's Dream a Garden, and 2020's Pillowland. He has also produced for artists such as Kelela, Troye Sivan, Gaika, and Olivia Rodrigo.

Recordings

Classical Curves

Jam City's debut album, Classical Curves, was released in 2012 to positive reception. Sonically, the album featured glossy, alien-sounding post-dubstep and club music and established his reputation for creating instrumentals from club music tropes. The Quietus called it "one of the most interesting album-length listens to come from a UK club producer in a while."

Dream a Garden

Latham's follow-up album, Dream a Garden, was released in 2015. Inspired by the 2011 England riots and the work of bell hooks, the album further developed the socio-political conscience of his debut, engaging particularly with the effects of neoliberalism. Latham said the album "is about the personal effects of living under capitalism. Why do I feel shit and why do the people I love feel shit when they look at billboards?" The first single from the album, Unhappy, critiques corruptive elements of online porn.

Work with others
Latham has also written songs and produced for Kelela, producing "Keep It Cool" and "Cherry Coffee" on her mixtape Cut 4 Me, and providing a remix of "Keep It Cool" on the deluxe edition.

Personal life
Latham grew up in the suburbs of South London. He later worked individually in corporate espionage and as a fashion designer.

Discography

Albums
 Classical Curves (2012)
 Dream a Garden (2015)
 Pillowland (2020)

Singles and EPs
 Refixes 12" (2010)
 "Magic Drops" (2010)
 Waterworx EP (2011)
 "Glide" (2012)
 Classical Club Mixes (2012)
 Club Constructions Vol 6 (2013)
 "Unhappy" (2014)
 "Proud" (2015)
 Earthly Versions (2015)
 Trouble Mixtape (2016)

Songwriting and production credits

References

Living people
British record producers
British electronic musicians
British experimental musicians
Year of birth missing (living people)